The 1978–79 international cricket season was from September 1978 to April 1979.

Season overview

October

India in Pakistan

December

England in Australia

West Indies in India

February

Pakistan in New Zealand

March

Pakistan in Australia

References

International cricket competitions by season
1978 in cricket
1979 in cricket